P is a programming language for asynchronous event-driven programming and the IoT that was developed by Microsoft and University of California, Berkeley.

P enables programmers to specify systems consisting of a collection of state machines that communicate asynchronously in terms of events.  Code can be run on Microsoft Windows and Windows Phone, and is now open source licensed under MIT License and available on GitHub.

See also 

 Microsoft Research
 Free software movement

References

Further reading 
 P: Safe asynchronous event-driven programming. Ankush Desai, Vivek Gupta, Ethan Jackson, Shaz Qadeer, Sriram Rajamani, and Damien Zufferey. In Proceedings of ACM SIGPLAN Conference on Programming Language Design and Implementation (PLDI), 2013.
 Systematic testing of asynchronous reactive systems. Ankush Desai, Shaz Qadeer, and Sanjit A. Seshia. In Proceedings of the 2015 10th Joint Meeting on Foundations of Software Engineering (ESEC/FSE 2015).
 Building Reliable Distributed Systems With P. Ankush Desai, Ethan Jackson, Amar Phanishayee, Shaz Qadeer and Sanjit A. Seshia. University of California, Berkeley. Technical Report No. UCB/EECS-2015-198.

External links 
 
 P: Safe Asynchronous Event-Driven Programming
 P: A programming language designed for asynchrony, fault-tolerance and uncertainty

Free and open-source software
Microsoft free software
Microsoft programming languages
Programming languages created in 2012
Software using the MIT license
Systems programming languages
2012 software